Suburban Records is a record label based in the Netherlands. In 1999 Suburban Records, the inhouse label of Suburban Marketing & Distribution was created giving a home to bands like Peter Pan Speedrock, El Guapo Stuntteam, Hermano, Astrosoniq, Mina Caputo and the latest signings Shaking Godspeed, Paceshifters and Gingerpig.

Suburban's philosophy is to form and maintain a healthy music industry within the Benelux. Suburban is convinced that there has to be a strong platform for non-mainstream musical products in general, and for the popular (heavy) rock in particular.

Artists 
Artists as of 2011:
 Peter Pan Speedrock
 Gingerpig
 Shaking Godspeed
 Black Bottle Riot
 Paceshifters
 The Ettes
 El Guapo Stuntteam
 Asylum On The Hill
 Kingfisher Sky
 The View
 Mina Caputo
 Exile Parade
 Hermano
 Repomen
 Hydromatics
 Cooper
 Incense
 Miss Moses
 Pale
 Birth of Joy

Discography 

Peter Pan Speedrock
Peter Pan (1997)
Rocketfuel (1998)
Killermachine (2000)
Premium Quality... Serve Loud! (2001)
Lucky Bastards (2003)
Spread Eagle (2005)
Pursuit Until Capture (2007)
We Want Blood (2010)

Gingerpig
The Ways Of The Gingerpig (2011)

Shaking Godspeed
AWE (2010)

Paceshifters
One for the Road (2010)

The Ettes
 Look At Life Again Soon (2008)

El Guapo Stuntteam
Soul Style (demo) (1997)
El Guapo Stuntteam (1999)
Year Of The Panther (2001)
Battles Across The Stereo Spectrum (2004)
Accusation Blues (2007)
El Guapo Stuntteam (2009)

Asylum On The Hill
Passage To The Puzzle Factory (2010)

Kingfisher Sky
Hallway of Dreams (2007)
Skin of the Earth (2010)

The View
Which Bitch? (2009)

Mina Caputo
A Fondness For Hometown Scars (2008)

Exile Parade
Fire Walk With Me (2008)

HermanoLive at W2 (2005)...Into The Exam Room (2007)

RepomenRoadkill (2008)

HydromaticsThe Earth Is Shaking (2007)

CooperActivate (2001)

IncenseApprox 45 Min (2001)On Tip Of Wings We Walk (2003)

Miss MosesLimbs Divine (2007)

PalePale (2001)

Birth of JoyLife in Babalou'' (2012)

See also 
 List of record labels
 Independent record label

External links
 

Dutch record labels
Alternative rock record labels